The Second Harutyunyan government is the current governing body of Artsakh since its formation on 21 May 2020. Arayik Harutyunyan is the current President, who was elected in 2020 general election and is the head of state and head of government.

It is a minority government of Free Motherland - UCA Alliance with the support of United Motherland party.

Structure 
The structure of the government of Artsakh consists of twelve ministries and three other bodies. Each ministry is responsible for elaborating and implementing governmental decisions in its respective sphere.

References 

European governments
Cabinets established in 2017
Executive branch of the government of the Republic of Artsakh
Harutyunyan